Club Deportivo Ejidatarios de Bonfil is a Mexican football club that plays in the Tercera División de México. The club is based in Cancún, Mexico.

See also
Football in Mexico

External links
Official Page

References 

Football clubs in Quintana Roo
Sports teams in Cancún
2009 establishments in Mexico
Association football clubs established in 2009